Wings is a 1978 play by American playwright Arthur Kopit.  Originating as a radio play, it was later adapted for stage and screen.

In 1976, Kopit was commissioned to write an original radio play by the NPR drama project Earplay. Just prior, his father suffered a debilitating stroke, which inspired Kopit to write the play about the language disorder and psychological perspective of a stroke victim.  The female character of the play is an amalgam of two women who were both patients at the rehab center that cared for his father.

Production history
The first professional stage production of Wings opened at the Yale Repertory Theatre in New Haven, Connecticut on March 3, 1978, with Constance Cummings as Emily Stilson, and Marianne Owen as Amy.

The Yale Rep Theatre cast and crew was as follows:
Emily Stilson - Constance Cummings
Amy - Marianne Owen
Doctors - Geoffrey Pierson, Roy Steinberg
Nurses - Caris Corfman, Carol Ostrow
Billy - Richard Grusin
Mr. Brownstein - Ira Bernstein
Mrs. Timmins - Betty Pelzer
Directed by John Madden
Designed by Andrew Jackness
Costumes by Jeanne Button
Lighting by Tom Schraeder
Sound by Tom Voegeli
Music by Herb Pilhofer

Wings opened at the Off-Broadway New York Shakespeare Festival Public/ Newman Theater, presented by Joseph Papp, on June 21, 1978 for a limited run to July 2, 1978. This was the Yale Rep production with the same cast and creatives.

Wings opened on Broadway at the Lyceum Theatre on January 28, 1979 and closed on May 5, 1979 after 113 performances and 6 previews.
The cast and crew was as follows:
Emily Stilson - Constance Cummings
Amy - Mary-Joan Negro
Doctors - Roy Steinberg, Ross Petty
Nurses - Gina Franz, Mary Michele Rutherfurd
Billy - James Tolkan
Mr. Brownstein - Carl Don
Mrs. Timmins - Betty Pelzer
Directed by John Madden
Designed by Andrew Jackness
Costumes by Jeanne Button
Lighting by Tom Schraeder
Sound by Tom Voegeli
Music by Herb Pilhofer

It was filmed for U.S. television in 1983, starring Constance Cummings and Mary-Joan Negro.

Themes
Richard Eder wrote in The New York Times: "Wings is a remarkable attempt to dramatize the agony of a stroke victim. It presents [a] mind whose language has been knocked out from under it; one that struggles blindly, with alternating grace and terror, to regain its footing."

Michael Billington wrote: "...this is a play about language – about Emily’s progress from a jumbled, disordered speech to one that achieves a wondrous coherence."

Awards and recognition
1979 Drama Desk Award, Outstanding Actress in a Play, Cummings, winner
1979 Drama Desk Award Outstanding Director of a Play, nominee
1979 Drama Desk Award Outstanding New Play, nominee
1979 Obie Award, Performance, Cummings, winner
1979 Tony Award Play, nominee
1979 Tony Award Actress in a Play, Cummings, winner
1979 Tony Award Featured Actress in a Play, Mary-Joan Negro, nominee
 1979 Selection, The Burns Mantle Theater Yearbook, The Best Plays of 1978-1979

Adaptations

The play was adapted into a musical of the same name with music by Jeffrey Lunden and book and lyrics by Arthur Perlman, which premiered at Chicago's Goodman Theatre in October 1992.

References

Plays by Arthur Kopit
1978 plays